Oscar Saul Galíndez (born June 5, 1971, in Río Tercero, Córdoba, Argentina) is a triathlete. He competed in the first Olympic triathlon at the 2000 Summer Olympics, obtaining the twenty-eighth place with a total time of 1:50:59.48.

Galíndez, began in triathlon when his was 16 year old. He soon was able to win the Hexa-championship "Trofeu Brasil de Triatlo" and Duathlon World Championship. In 1995, Galíndez decided to move and live in Brazil, where the training and races conditions were better than in Argentina.

Oscar has won innumerable victories that have made him build a great sporting career with more than 29 years of victories, becoming the foremost Argentinean in his specialty and one of the best triathletes in Latin America, as well as in the world.

In 2000, Galíndez had a good performance at the Olympic games in Sydney. By the year 2001 he started his preparation for long-distance races, as Ironman.

Oscar is the creator and founder of OG Design (Sports brand of high-performance and style to be using in races and training), in addition to his brilliant career as triathlete, is the principal researcher and field test pilot, where with his extremely demanding perfectionist and approves every new product that will launch the brand.

He won almost all the Argentine triathlon, Brazilian triathlon, and several triathlon competitions around the world Pan American bronze medal in 1995 and 2003, Duathlon World Championship in 1995 and silver medal in Ironman 70.3 World Championship 2007.Oscar Galindez main titles

He was also awarded best athlete of the province of Cordoba 1994 and awarded by the Konex Foundation within the top 100 athletes of Argentina of all time.

References

External links
Official site

1971 births
Living people
Sportspeople from Córdoba Province, Argentina
Argentine male triathletes
Olympic triathletes of Argentina
Triathletes at the 1995 Pan American Games
Triathletes at the 1999 Pan American Games
Triathletes at the 2000 Summer Olympics
Triathletes at the 2003 Pan American Games
Duathletes
Pan American Games bronze medalists for Argentina
Pan American Games medalists in triathlon
Medalists at the 1995 Pan American Games
Medalists at the 2003 Pan American Games